A list of films produced in Italy in 1979 (see 1979 in film):

References

Footnotes

Sources

External links
Italian films of 1979 at the Internet Movie Database

1979
Films
Lists of 1979 films by country or language